Marina Torres (1901–1967) was a Spanish stage and film actress.

Selected filmography
 Daughter of the Sea (1917)
 Carnival Figures (1926)
 The Village Priest (1927)
 Agustina of Aragon (1929)
 Goyescas (1942)
 Lola Leaves for the Ports (1947)
 Service at Sea (1951)

References

Bibliography 
 Goble, Alan. The Complete Index to Literary Sources in Film. Walter de Gruyter, 1999.

External links 
 

1901 births
1967 deaths
Film actresses from Catalonia
Spanish film actresses
Spanish silent film actresses
Actresses from Barcelona